Biobío Province is one of three provinces of the Chilean region of Biobío (VIII). Its capital is Los Ángeles (2002 pop. 94,716). It is bounded on the north, west and south by the provinces of Concepción, Arauco and Malleco, respectively, and on the east by Argentina. The population is 373,981 according to the census of 2012.
 
The great trunk railway from Santiago south to Puerto Montt crosses the western part of the province and also connects it with the port of Concepción.

History

The Province of Bio-Bío was created on October 13, 1875, as part of the Province of Araucan.  In 1887, President José Manuel Balmaceda set aside the Province of Malleco.  The province was then named for the Bio-Bio River which flows through it.  The Province of Bío Bío was divided, into three departments:

 
As part of the process of regionalization in the 1970s, the Region of 
Biobío was created. By Decree #1,213 of 27 of November 4, 1975, the VIII Region comprises the provinces of Bio Bío, Arauco and Concepción. Ñuble was formerly part of Biobío Province, before becoming its own region on the 5th of September 2018.

Administration
As a province, Bio Bío is a second-level administrative division of Chile, governed by a provincial governor who is appointed by the president.

Communes
The province is composed of 14 communes, each governed by a municipality consisting of an elected alcalde and municipal council.

Alto Bio Bío
Antuco
Cabrero
Laja
Los Ángeles (capital)
Mulchén
Nacimiento
Negrete
Quilaco
Quilleco
San Rosendo
Santa Bárbara
Tucapel
Yumbel

Geography and demography
It is the tenth most populated province in the country. Of these, 245,775 (69.6%) lived in urban areas and 107,540 (30.4%) in rural areas. Between the 1992 and 2002 censuses, the population grew by 9.1% (29,405 persons).

Bio Bío Valley wine region
The Bio Bío Valley wine region is located in the province and region of the same name. One of Chile's southern wine regions, it has become known for its crisp, aromatic wines.
The region is located at a latitude of 36°S, similar to southern Spain and Monterey in California. It receives  of rain per year, among the highest of all Chilean wine valleys, although winds prevent excessive humidity - a phenomenon that can also be observed in northern France. For most of the 20th century, the main varieties grown in the Bio Bío valley were Moscatel de Alejandria and Pais (known as Missiones in USA), but today, Pinot Noir, Chardonnay, and Sauvignon Blanc are also grown throughout the valley.

The UK's Co-Op's Bio Bío Valley Malbec (2014) was awarded silver at the International Wine Challenge and a bronze from Decanter magazine.

Grape distribution by varietal
 Climate: moderate Mediterranean climate.  of rain per year. Average rainfall is among highest seen in any Chilean wine valley, although winds prevent humidity.
 Soils: Alluvial soils, clay and sand.
 Primary grapes: Pinot noir, Chardonnay and Sauvignon blanc.
                                              	

 
Total hectares planted:

See also
Chilean wine

Notes 

Provinces of Chile
Provinces of Biobío Region